Qian Xiuling (1912–2008), or Siou-Ling Tsien de Perlinghi, was a Chinese-Belgian scientist who won a medal for saving nearly 100 lives during World War II in Belgium. She had a street named after her and a 16-episode TV drama was made of her life for Chinese television.

Life

Qian was born in Yixing in Jiangsu Province in 1912 to a large and well connected family.

In 1929, she left for Europe to study chemistry in Belgium at the Catholic University of Leuven.

In 1933, she married Grégoire de Perlinghi, a Belgian doctor, after breaking her engagement to her Chinese fiancé, and they went to live in Herbeumont.

In 1939, one source suggests that she travelled to Paris in hopes of studying in Marie Curie's laboratory but the whole facility had been moved to the United States because of the war.

In June 1940, her town of Herbeumont was occupied by the German army when a Belgian youth blew up a military train by burying a mine under the railway. The youth was sentenced to death, but Qian realised that she knew the German general who was in charge of Belgium. She had known General Alexander von Falkenhausen when he was working in China as part of the Sino-German cooperation. Falkenhausen had been an advisor to Chiang Kai-shek and he worked closely with Qian's elder cousin, Lieutenant General Qian Zhuolun. She wrote a letter and travelled to see Falkenhausen, who decided to use his authority to spare the boy for reasons of humanity.

On 7 June 1944, Qian was contacted again when the Germans had taken 97 Belgians prisoner under sentence of death in revenge for three Gestapo officers who had been killed in the nearby town of Écaussinnes. Despite being pregnant with her first child she again travelled to see Falkenhausen and asked him to intervene. He hesitated but eventually agreed to release the people, although he knew that he was disobeying an order. The general was summoned to Berlin to explain his insubordination. Falkenhausen was spared German trial and punishment by the war's end, but was arrested for war crimes. He was tried in Belgium in 1951.

Qian appeared at the trial and pleaded for Falkenhausen's good character. He was sentenced for twelve years for executing hostages and deporting Jews, and deported to Germany to serve his sentence.  After three weeks, when the minimum sentence according Belgium law had passed, he was pardoned by German chancellor Konrad Adenauer and retired. He died in 1966.

Legacy

Qian was awarded the Medal of Belgian Gratitude 1940–1945 by the  Belgian government.

Qian's story was made into a sixteen-episode Chinese TV drama, Chinese Woman Facing Gestapo's Gun, starring Xu Qing. She was given a medal by the Belgians after the war but she never told her family in China of her story.

In 2003, Qian's granddaughter, Tatiana de Perlinghi, made a documentary film entitled Ma grand-mère, une héroïne? (My grandma, a heroine?).

In 2005, she was thanked by Zhang Qiyue the Chinese Ambassador to Belgium who visited the rest home where she lived. Qian's husband had died in 1966. There is a street named Rue Perlinghi in her honour in the city of Ecaussinnes. A novel by Zhang Yawen was published in 2003 with the English title of Chinese Woman at Gestapo Gunpoint .

References

External links

Sohu special report on Qian Xiuling 

1912 births
2008 deaths
People from Yixing
Chinese women chemists
Belgian women scientists
Catholic University of Leuven (1834–1968) alumni
20th-century women scientists
Belgian resistance members
Chinese emigrants to Belgium
20th-century Belgian scientists
Scientists from Wuxi
Chemists from Jiangsu
Recipients of orders, decorations, and medals of Belgium